Caitríona Ryan is a camogie player and an accountant, who played in the 2009 All Ireland camogie final. Catríona played in goal on the All-Ireland Senior final team in 2001 against Tipperary. An All-Ireland Colleges medal holder, she went on to capture a Junior title in 2002 and was a member of the successful National League-winning team in 2008. Her senior debut was in 2001.

References

External links 
 Official Camogie Website
 Kilkenny Camogie Website
 Review of 2009 championship in On The Ball Official Camogie Magazine
 https://web.archive.org/web/20091228032101/http://www.rte.ie/sport/gaa/championship/gaa_fixtures_camogie_oduffycup.html Fixtures and results] for the 2009 O'Duffy Cup
 All-Ireland Senior Camogie Championship: Roll of Honour
 Video highlights of 2009 championship Part One and part two
 Video Highlights of 2009 All Ireland Senior Final
 Report of All Ireland final in Irish Times Independent and Examiner

1983 births
Living people
Camogie goalkeepers
Kilkenny camogie players